Kulappulli Leela is an Indian actress who predominantly appears in Malayalam cinema, Tamil cinema and television. She has mostly done comedic roles, and has appeared in over 350 films. She began her career acting through theatre dramas.

Filmography

Malayalam

 1998 – Ayal Kadha Ezhuthukayanu  –  Thresiamma
 2000 – Madhuranomparakkattu .... Leelavathi teacher
 2001 – Narendran Makan Jayakanthan Vaka   –  Sharada
 2001 – Soothradharan
 2002 – Nammal
 2002 – Grand Mother
 2002 – Nammal
 2003 – Kasthooriman... Raji's mother in law
 2003 – Mizhi Randilum  .... Bhargavi
 2003 – Hariharan Pilla Happiyannu
 2003 – Manassinakkare
 2003 – Pulival Kalyanam
 2003 – Saudhamini .... Kallikutty
 2003 – Kasthooriman –  Raji's mother in law
 2003 – Ente Ammakku – short film
 2004 – Black  .... Veronica
 2004 – Chathikkatha Chandhu ... Chandhu's mother
 2004 – Freedom 
 2004 – Mambazhakkalam .... Chakka Ammayi
 2004 – Sethuramaiyer CBI  ... Servant (Mariyakutty)
 2004 – Thudakkam ... Narayaniyamma
 2005 – Bunglavil Outha
 2005 – Alice in Wonderland  –  Martha
 2005 – Bus Conductor
 2005 – Chandrolsavam  – . Ramanunni's Mother
 2005 – Kasthuri Maan (Tamil)  –  Muniyamma
 2005 – OK Chacko Cochin Mumbai – Pathumma
 2005 – Police   – . Rajamma
 2005 – Udayon  –  Kuttiyamma
 2006 – Moonamathoral
 2006 – Balram vs Tharadas  –  Prisoner
 2007 – Black Cat
 2007 – Changathippoocha .... Aiswaryan's mother
 2007 – Nanma .... Jaanu
 2007 – Thakarachenda
 2008 – SMS 
 2008 – Aandavan .... Mariyamma
 2008 – Annan Thambi
 2008 – De Engottu Nokkiye ... Servant
 2008 – Jubilee(2008).... Karthayani
 2008 – Robo
 2008 – Sulthan
 2008 – Twenty Twenty ... Servant
 2008 – Shakespeare M.A. Malayalam  –  Philomina
 2009 – Ivar Vivahitharayal .... Fish Seller
 2009 – Paribhavam
 2009 – Dr. Patient  –  Eliamma
 2009 – Utharaswayamvaram  –  Fortune Teller
 2010 – Ringtone
 2010 – 9KK Road
 2010 – Drona
 2010 – Fiddle
 2010 – Karyasthan .... Bus Passenger
 2010 – Nizhal
 2010 – Sufi Paranja Katha
 2010 – Annarakkannanum Thannalayathu
 2010 – Best Actor  –  Servant at Lal Jose's House
 2010 – Rama Ravanan   – . Rajamma
 2010 – Thanthonni
 2010 – Inganeyum Oral –  Kamalakshi
 2011 – 101 Uruppika
 2011 – Female Unnikrishnan
 2011 – Lucky Jokers
 2011 – Mannikkyakkallu
 2011 – Nadakame Ulakam
 2011 – Sandwich
 2011 – Swargam 9 KM
 2011 – White & Black
 2011 – Kudumbasree Travels   – . Kunjannamma
 2011 – Manushya Mrugam  –  Thresiamma
 2011 – Teja Bhai & Family  –  Ramani
 2012 – Bhaghavathipuram
 2012 – Ennennum Ormmakkayi
 2012 – Ezham Suryan.... Omana
 2012 – Ina
 2012 – Kalikalam .... Nani
 2012 – Prabuvinte Makkal .... Cheriyamma Janu
 2012 – Themmadikkootam
 2012 – Theruvu Nakshatragal..... Janaki
 2012 – Vaidooryam
 2012 – Doctor Innocent aanu   –  Thresiamma
 2012 – Hero
 2013 – Breaking News Live
 2013 – Progress Report....Mariya
 2013 – Amen  –  Therutha
 2013 – Entry  –  Chinnamma
 2013 – My Fan Ramu
 2013 – Nadodimannan –  Leela
 2013 – Vallatha Pahayan – Naani Thala
 2014 – Manja .... Jackson's mother
 2014 – Mylanchi Monchulla Veedu
 2014 – Nattarangu
 2014 – Njaanaannu Party
 2014 – Odum Raja Aadum Rani
 2014 – Ottamandhaaram
 2014 – Rakatharakshas 3D
 2014 – Tharangal
 2014 – Wonderful Journey
 2014 – Maramkothi  –  Marutha Mariya
 2015 – Ariyahte Ishtamyi
 2015 – Elinjikkavu PO
 2015 – Ithinumappuram
 2015 – Kanthari
 2015 – Kidney Biriyani
 2015 – Kunjuramayanam
 2015 – Ormakalil Oru Manju Kaalam .... Khadeejumma
 2015 – Uthara Chemmeen
 2016 – Dum
 2016 – Kattumakkan
 2016 – Noolppaalam
 2016 – Oru Muthassi Gadha
 2016 – Paulettante Veedu  .... Mariyamma
 2016 – Poyi Maranju Parayathe
 2017 – Kaaliyan
 2017 – Kuntham
 2017 – Oru Visheshapetta Biriyani Kisa
 2018 – Daivame Kai Thozham K Kumarakanam .... Narayani
 2018 – Dustbin
 2018 – Kuttanadan Marpappa
 2018 – Mattanchery
 2018 – Oru Pazhaya Bomb Katha .... Bhavyan's mother
 2018 – Sakhavinte Priyasakhi .... Dakshayini
 2018 – Suvarna Purushan
 2018 – Theetta Rappai
 2018 – Wonder Boys
 2018 – Daivam Sakshi ... Ammini
 2018 – Ippozhum Eppozhum Sthuthi Ayirikkatte
 2018 – Mottitta Mullakal
 2018 – Thanaha ... Ammini
 2018 – Vallikudilile Vellakkaran
 2019 – Akakkannu  – short film
 2019 – Makkana
 2019 – Moonam Pralayam
 2019 – An International Local Story
 2019 – Freakens
 2019 – Onnam Sakshi
 2020 –  Thallumpidi
 2020 –  Varky
 2020 – Mother's Day – short film
 2020 – Vahini .... Madhavi Amma
 2021 – Cabin .... Rukku
 2021 – Enpathukalile Epyanmar
 2021 – Karingal – short film
 2021 – Pravasi – short film
 2022 – 5il Oral Thaskaran .... Naniyamma
 2022 – Anandakalyanam
 2022 – Karingal – short film
 2022 – Karnan Napoleon Bhagath Singh
 2022 – Leela Vilasam – short film
 2022 – Nipah
 2022 – Oru Pakka Nadan Premam
 2022 – Ulkkazhcha .... School cook
 College Cuties
 Gulikan
 Kadal Kuthira .... Margret
 Marutha
 Mathamgi .... Janaki
 Mayakottaram
 Mayil
 Oru Flashback Story
 Prathi Niraparathiyano .... Pennamma
 Ssshh

Tamil

 1995 – Muthu
 2005 – Kasthuri Maan – Muniyamma
 2010 – Semmozhi
 2016 – Marudhu – Maariamma (Appatha)
 2016 – Nee Enbathu
 2018 – Naachiyaar
 2018 – Uzhaikkum Paadhai
 2019 – Airaa – Parvathy
 2021 – Annaatthe – Kaalaiyan's grandmother
 2021 – Aranmanai 3 – Valliamma
 2021 – Master – Juvenile prison cook
 2021 – Chinnanjiru Kiliye
 2022 – Kombu Vatcha Singamda

Television
TV series

 Abhayam
 Guru
 Mizhineerpoovukal - telefilm
 Kunjunju Kathakal (Asianet)
 Valsalyam (Surya TV)
 Paribhavam Parvathy (Asianet)
 Sangathi Contra (Asianet)
 Sanmanassullavarkku Samadhanam ( Asianet)
 Veendum Chila Veettuviseshangal ( Asianet)
 Enkilum Ente Gopalakrishna  ( Asianet)
 Kochu Thresya Kochu (Kairali TV)
 Velankani Mathavu (Surya TV)
 Ente Manasaputhri (Asianet)
 Thulabharam (Surya TV)
 Minnukettu (Surya TV)
 Nandhanam (Surya TV)
 Pattukalude Paattu (Surya TV)
 Kudumbarahasyam
 Calling Bell (Surya TV)
 Snehanjali
 Aliyanmarum Penganmarum  (Amtrita TV)
 Ammayikakkante Visheshangal
 Padichapathoonte Veedu
 Vrindavanam(Asianet)
 Kudumbasametham Mannikutty (Jaihind)
 Mayamadhavam (Surya TV)
 Penmanasu (Surya TV)
 Manassu Parayunna Karyangal (Mazhavil Manorama)
 Mayamohini (Mazhavil Manorama)
 Decent Family (Jaihind)
Vallarpadathamma(Shalom TV)
 Punchiri Travels (Kairali TV)
 Junior chanakyan (Flowers TV)
 Kunnamkulathangadi (Media One)
 Bharya (Asianet)
 Maya (Sun TV) - Tamil
Classmates (Flowers TV)
Chackoyum Maryyum (Mazhavil Manorama)
Koodathayi (Flowers TV)
 Sundari - Bangle Bangaram (Surya TV) Guest appearance
Ente Maathavu (Surya TV)

Web series
 Instagramam (neestream)
 Vadhandhi: The Fable of Velonie (2022)

See also
Kulappulli, Leela's ancestral town

References

External links
 
 Kulappulli Leela at MSI

Living people
Actresses from Kozhikode
Actresses in Malayalam cinema
Indian film actresses
Indian women comedians
21st-century Indian actresses
People from Kozhikode district
Malayalam comedians
20th-century Indian actresses
Indian television actresses
Actresses in Malayalam television
Year of birth missing (living people)
Actresses in Tamil cinema
Actresses in Tamil television